The helmeted friarbird (Philemon buceroides) is part of the Meliphagidae family. The helmeted friarbird, along with all their subspecies, is commonly referred to as “leatherhead” by the birding community.

Description 
The helmeted friarbird has a dark gray face with red eyes. This bird is a gray-brown bird with a fading white as it comes toward the chest. As the spotted chest approaches the feet, it starts to tint darker until it gets to the feet. The bird ranges from 32-36 centimeters weighing in at 127-179g for males and 92-112g for females. The average male measures about 38 cm, and is the largest subspecies of the 4 helmeted friarbirds found in Australlia.

Distribution and habitat 
The helmeted friarbird is most prominently abundant in the Northern Territory coasts of Australia and Indonesia. The specific habitat of the friarbird varies based on the subspecies; however, they are mainly found in subtropical or tropical dry forests, lowland forests, and mangrove forests. While building nests, the friarbirds typically use bark, leaves and stems to create a sturdy structure. They will also use sticks for extra support and grass for comfort. They tend to build their nests close to a body of water and high in trees to avoid harm.

Reproduction 
Breeding for the helmeted friarbird most commonly happens throughout the months of September to February, occasionally throughout the months of February to May and October to December, but never in the months of May and July.

While breeding the helmeted friarbird typically lays 2-4 eggs at a time; however, they can lay up to 5 at a time. The incubation period only takes 15-18 days. 

The lifespan of a helmeted friarbird is roughly 5-7 years. The helmeted friarbird's population has currently been evaluated as stable; however, it is suspected that within the next 10 years the population will decrease by 10%, therefore ultimately classifying the species as vulnerable.

The friarbird is quickly becoming closer to extinction with a decrease of ten percent after every generation. With the average lifespan only being five to seven years, this species is in danger. Unfortunately, the current population is unknown but we do know that it is declining by that ten percent.

Behavior 
The helmeted friarbird is very vocal with loud "squawks"  that can be heard from afar. They are known for sounding like keeyo-keoway or kowee ko keeyo which can be repeated up to a dozen times. In addition, they also vocalize kurr-rk frequently which they slowly repeat from eight to ten times. The friarbird typically is more vocal in the morning and during storms and is quiet throughout the rest of the time. There are only slim differences between the male and female as well.

Diet 
The helmeted friarbird eats a variety of food. The main source of their nutrients includes nectar, fruits and seeds. Occasionally they will eat invertebrates, and on a rare occasion they will eat lizards; however, the basics of their diet vary according to their location.

Subspecies
The hornbill friarbird (P. b. yorki) of Cape York Peninsula and coastal north-eastern Queensland is sometimes considered a subspecies of the helmeted friarbird or as a full species. The same is also true of the New Guinea friarbird (P. b. novaeguineae).

References

helmeted friarbird
Birds of the Lesser Sunda Islands
Birds of the Aru Islands
Birds of New Guinea
Birds of the Northern Territory
Birds of Queensland
helmeted friarbird
Taxonomy articles created by Polbot